Curticoelotes is a genus of east Asian funnel weavers. It was first described by K. Okumura in 2020, and it has only been found in Japan.

Species
 it contains six species:
C. hamamurai (Yaginuma, 1967) – Japan
C. hiradoensis (Okumura & Ono, 2006) – Japan
C. kintaroi (Nishikawa, 1983) – Japan
C. oxyacanthus (Okumura, 2013) – Japan
C. sawadai (Nishikawa, 2009) – Japan
C. taurus (Nishikawa, 2009) – Japan

See also
 List of Agelenidae species

References

Further reading

Agelenidae genera
Arthropods of Japan